Arturo Sacchetti (Santhià, near Vercelli, 9 January 1941) is an Italian organist, conductor and musicologist.  He worked as artistic director at the Radio Vatican.

He studied at the Conservatorio di Milano.  He has given over 2,300 concerts, as choral conductor, orchestral conductor, organist, harpsichordist, and pianist.  He has performed in public the complete works of J. S. Bach, Buxtehude, Mozart, Telemann, and others. He has made 150 recordings, on LP as well as CD.

For many years, Sacchetti has dedicated himself to the music of Lorenzo Perosi, whose complete works he is performing, recording, and editing.

Appointments 
 Direzione del Coro da camera della RAI
 Insegnamento presso il Conservatorio S. Cecilia di Roma
 Direzione artistica della Radio Vaticana
 Direzione del Liceo Musicale G.B. Viotti di Vercelli
 Direzione della Società cameristica di Lugano
 Direttore artistico dell' Accademia Internazionale di Musica "G. Carisio" del "Civico Istituto di Musica" di Asti
 Direttore artistico dell' "Ente perosiano" di Tortona
 Direttore artistico della "Associazione artistica C. L. Centemeri" di Monza
 Direttore del "Centro studi C. Della Giacoma" di Todi
 Docente d'organo della "Regia Accademia Filarmonica" di Bologna
 Docente dell' "Accademia L. Perosi" di Tortona
 Ispettore onorario del Ministero dei Beni Artistici e Storici.
 Accademico per chiara fama dalla "Regia Accademia Filarmonica" di Bologna.

See also 
 Don Lorenzo Perosi

References

Italian musicologists
Italian classical organists
Italian male conductors (music)
1941 births
Academic staff of the Accademia Nazionale di Santa Cecilia
Living people
People from Santhià
21st-century Italian conductors (music)
21st-century Italian male musicians
21st-century organists